R. S. G. Chelladurai (2 November 1936 – 29 April 2021), also known as Ayya Chelladurai, was an Indian actor, known for playing supporting roles in Tamil films as a father and as a grandfather. His breakthrough performance came in the film, Theri (2016).

Career 
Chelladurai began his acting career in church acting troupes, before moving on to work in theatre. As a day job, he worked at the government headquarters. While his theatre colleagues received opportunities to work with director Shankar in his earlier films, Chelladurai had narrowly lost out on chances. He later made his film debut with Shankar's Anniyan (2005), before going on to work again with the director in Sivaji (2007) and Nanban (2012).

Chelladurai often appeared in films as a father or grandfather, and worked on over 100 films. Chelladurai won acclaim for his role in Theri (2016). He later notably appeared in films including Maari (2015) where he featured in a comedic role alongside Dhanush and Robo Shankar.

Filmography 

Anniyan (2005)
Veyil (2006)
Sivaji (2007)
Nanban (2012)
Karuppampatti (2013)
Raja Rani (2013)
Kaththi (2014)
Maari (2015)
Theri (2016)
Kanavu Variyam (2017)
Aramm (2017)
Tik Tik Tik (2018)
Goli Soda 2 (2018)
Airaa (2019)
Natpe Thunai (2019)
Karuppankaatu Valasu (2020)
Bhoomi (2021)

Death 
He died following a heart attack on 29 April 2021, at his residence in Chennai’s Periyar Nagar. He was 84 years old.

References 

2021 deaths
21st-century Tamil male actors
Indian male comedians
Indian male film actors
Male actors in Tamil cinema
Tamil comedians
Tamil male actors
1937 births